Attila Balázs and Amir Hadad were the defending champions, but they chose to not play together this year.
Hungarian player, Balázs, decided to compete with Dušan Lojda. They were eliminated by Ismar Gorčić and Simone Vagnozzi in the semifinals.
Player from Israel, Hadad, partnered with Philipp Marx, but they lost to Nikola Ćirić and Miljan Zekić in the quarterfinals.
Dustin Brown and Rainer Eitzinger defeated Gorčić and Vagnozzi 6–4, 6–3 in the final.

Seeds

Draw

Draw

References
 Doubles Draw

Banja Luka Challenger - Doubles
2009 Doubles